The 2022–23 season is the 118th season in the existence of Leicester City Football Club and the club's ninth consecutive season in the Premier League. In addition to the league, they also competed in the season's editions of the FA Cup and EFL Cup.

Kits

Players

Squad information
Players and squad numbers last updated on 18 March 2023. Appearances include all competitions.Note: Flags indicate national team as has been defined under FIFA eligibility rules. Players may hold more than one non-FIFA nationality.

Transfers

In

Out

Loans in

Loans out

Pre-season and friendlies
On 5 June, Leicester City announced their first pre-season friendly, in Belgium against Oud-Heverlee Leuven. Ten days later, a trip to Preston North End was also confirmed, along with a behind-closed-doors meeting with Notts County. On June 16, a home friendly match against Sevilla was revealed. A fifth friendly, away to Derby County was also confirmed as part of the clubs preparations for the new season. The schedule was completed with the addition of Hull City away.

Competitions

Overall record

Premier League

League table

Results summary

Results by round

Matches

On 16 June, the Premier League fixtures were released.

FA Cup

The Foxes entered the FA Cup in the third round and won away against Gillingham. They also won away against Walsall in the fourth round. They were eliminated by Blackburn Rovers in the fifth round following a 2–1 home defeat.

EFL Cup

Leicester entered the competition in the second round and were drawn away to Stockport County. They won at home against Newport County in the third round, and won away against Milton Keynes Dons in the fourth round. The Foxes were knocked out of the competition away to Newcastle United in the quarter-finals.

Squad statistics

Appearances
As of 18 March 2023
Italics indicate a loaned player

|-
|colspan="16"|Out on loan:

|-
|colspan="16"|No longer at the club:

|}

Goalscorers
As of 18 March 2023

References

Leicester City F.C. seasons
Leicester City